Chez moi may refer to:

 Chez moi (album), a 1974 album by Serge Lama
 "Chez moi" (song), a song by Serge Lama
 Chez Moi (Desarthe novel), a 2009 novel by Agnès Desarthe
 Chez Moi, an 1887 painting by Harriet Backer